John Ambrose Meyer (May 15, 1899 – October 2, 1969) was a U.S. Representative from Maryland.

Biography
Born in Baltimore, Maryland, Meyer attended the grade schools and Loyola High School.  During the First World War, he enlisted as a private in the Students' Army Training Corps at Georgetown University, Washington, D.C., and served until honorably discharged from the United States Army.  He was graduated from Loyola College of Baltimore in 1921, and from the University of Maryland School of Law of Baltimore in 1922.  He was admitted to the bar in 1921 and commenced practice in Baltimore.  He served as associate judge of the traffic court of Baltimore from 1929 to 1935, and as special assistant city solicitor in 1939 and 1940.

Meyer was elected as a Democrat to the Seventy-seventh Congress (January 3, 1941 – January 3, 1943), but was an unsuccessful candidate for renomination in 1942.  He served as district rent attorney for the Office of Price Administration during the Second World War.  He engaged in the general practice of law in Baltimore, Maryland, until his death there on October 2, 1969.  He is interred in Holy Cross Cemetery.

References
 Retrieved on 2008-02-10

1899 births
1969 deaths
Georgetown University alumni
University of Maryland, Baltimore alumni
United States Army soldiers
United States Army personnel of World War I
Politicians from Baltimore
Democratic Party members of the United States House of Representatives from Maryland
20th-century American politicians